
Gmina Przyrów is a rural gmina (administrative district) in Częstochowa County, Silesian Voivodeship, in southern Poland.

Villages
Gmina Przyrów contains the villages and settlements of Aleksandrówka, Bolesławów, Julianka, Knieja, Kopaniny, Przyrów, Sieraków, Smyków, Stanisławów, Staropole, Sygontka, Wiercica, Wola Mokrzeska, Zalesice and Zarębice.

Neighbouring gminas
Gmina Przyrów is bordered by the gminas of Dąbrowa Zielona, Janów, Koniecpol, Lelów and Mstów.

References

Przyrow
Częstochowa County